Ludwig Berwald (8 December 1883 – 20 April 1942) was a German mathematician best known for his contributions to differential geometry, especially Finsler geometry. He taught in Munich and Prague for 32 years, publishing 54 papers, before being deported by the German secret police to the Łódź Ghetto, where he and his wife Hedwig died within a year.

Biography
Ludwig was one of three children of Max Berwald, an East Prussian owner of a famous bookstore, and Friedericke Fischel. They were "Jewish with Max coming from East Prussia and his wife being a native of Prague." In 1900, the family moved to Munich, where Ludwig matriculated at Ludwig Maximilian University in 1902. There he studied mathematics under Aurel Voss, alongside notable mathematicians Hugo Dingler and Fritz Noether, and received his PhD in 1908 for his thesis entitled Über die Krümmungseigenschaften der Brennflächen eines geradlinigen Strahlsystems und der in ihm enthaltenen Regelflächen (On the properties of curvature on the internal surfaces of rectilinear systems, and surfaces contained therein). Due to sanatorium treatment for pulmonary illness, he was unable to continue his work in Munich. Through friends, he eventually became a lecturer at the German University (now Charles University) back in Prague, achieving full professorship in 1924. There, he developed friendships and successful collaborations with fellow mathematicians Georg Pick, Paul Funk, and Élie Cartan, publishing some 54 articles which significantly advanced the field of Finsler geometry, pioneering important concepts which still bear his name such as Berwald curvature, Berwald spray, and the Berwald–Moór metric function. For extending the concept of Riemann curvature to Finsler spaces, Berwald has been credited as the founder of differential geometry of Finsler spaces. On 22 October 1941, the day after submitting his last article, the sickly 57 year old Berwald was deported to the Łódź Ghetto in Poland in the third transportation of Jews by the German secret police. The Berwalds were two of 55 people who lived in 48 Maryśinska Street in a one-room approximately 20 feet square with no beds. Hedwig, eight years older than her husband, died 27 March 1942; Ludwig followed 23 days later.

Selected works
 Berwald, L. "Untersuchung der Krümmung allgemeiner metrischer Räume auf Grund des in ihnen herrschenden Parallelismus," Mathematische Zeitschrift, 25 (1) (1926), pp. 40–73. 
 "Über eine charakteristische Eigenschaft der allgemeinen Räume konstanter Krümmung mit geradlinigen Extremalen," Monatshefte für Mathematik und Physik, 36 (1929), pp. 315–30. 
 Berwald, L. "On the Projective Geometry of Paths." Annals of Mathematics Second Series 37.4 (1936): 879–98. doi:10.2307/1968625

References

German people of Czech-Jewish descent
20th-century German mathematicians
1883 births
1942 deaths
Ludwig Maximilian University of Munich alumni
Academic staff of Charles University
German Jews who died in the Holocaust